A Bhatti glass, is a glass used in a bhatti to serve liquor.

A bhatti is a common word in Nepali language to refer to a place where locally prepared alcoholic preparations are served. Most of them are located in almost every settlements and sell Raksi.

Nepali words and phrases
Drinkware